The 1968 Grand Prix motorcycle racing season was the 20th F.I.M. Road Racing World Championship Grand Prix season. The season consisted of ten Grand Prix races in six classes: 500cc, 350cc, 250cc, 125cc, 50cc and Sidecars 500cc. It began on 21 April, with German Grand Prix and ended with Nations Grand Prix on 15 September. As the sidecar race was cancelled at the Nations Grand Prix, it was announced that a replacement race would be held at Hockenheimring in October alongside the German national championship.

Season summary
With the departure of Honda from the Grand Prix scene, MV Agusta proceeded to dominate the larger classes with Giacomo Agostini winning every race in the 500 and 350 classes. The 250 crown went to Phil Read amidst a controversy between Yamaha teammates. Read was supposed to take the 125 title while leaving the 250 crown for Bill Ivy. After Read captured the 125 title, he ignored team orders and went after the 250 title as well. As a result, Yamaha would discharge Read and he would never regain a place on the factory team. Hans-Georg Anscheidt would capture his third consecutive 50cc championship for Suzuki.

1968 Grand Prix season calendar

Footnotes

Standings

Scoring system
Points were awarded to the top six finishers in each race. Only the best of three were counted on 50cc championships, best of five in 125cc championships, best of six in 250cc and 500cc championships, while in the Sidecars and 350cc, the best of four races were counted.

500cc final standings

350cc Standings

250cc Standings

125cc Standings

50cc Standings

References

 Büla, Maurice & Schertenleib, Jean-Claude (2001). Continental Circus 1949-2000. Chronosports S.A. 

Grand Prix motorcycle racing seasons
Grand Prix motorcycle racing season